Chodavaram is a small village in Ramachandrapuram Mandal, East Godavari District, Andhra Pradesh, India.

References 

Villages in East Godavari district